Miracle Films (later to become 'Miracle Communications' in a development of the family business) was a film distributor based in the United Kingdom. The publicity manager of this studio, when it began in the 1950s, was British filmmaker Tony Tenser.

Miracle Films also distributed a lot of cult filmmakers Pete Walker films like Cool It Carol, The Flesh and Blood Show, House of Whitford and Frightmare

The head of the company in the late 1970s, Michael Myers, had the dubious distinction of having his name used for the main character (a homicidal maniac) in the multi-million-dollar Halloween film franchise begun by director John Carpenter and producers Irwin Yablans and Moustapha Akkad in 1978 after Myers successfully distributed Carpenter's earlier Assault on Precinct 13 in the UK in 1977.

The company's most notable release, and possibly one of its last, was The Care Bears Movie from 1985.

References

External links
A detailed history of the studio, as told by Tenser

Film distributors of the United Kingdom
Defunct mass media companies of the United Kingdom